North Dakota Highway 22 (ND 22) is a  major north–south state highway in North Dakota. It begins at the South Dakota state line south of the small town of Reeder and ends at ND 23 west of New Town and north of Mandaree. The route has one concurrency with U.S. Route 12 (US 12). The highway widely parallels US 85, running about fifteen miles east of it.

Route description
North Dakota Highway 22 begins at the South Dakota state line as a continuation of South Dakota Highway 79. From there it heads north to the town of Reeder. North of Reeder, the route joins U.S. Route 12, heading southeast for two miles. It then heads north, joining with Highway 21 south of New England. Highway 21's concurrency with Highway 22 ends at New England, and Highway 22 continues north to Dickinson, where it has a truck detour around a low railroad bridge before it meets Interstate 94 Bus. Loop and Interstate 94 itself.

ND 22 continues north to meet Highway 200 just south of the city of Killdeer. The highway enters the Badlands 12 miles north of Killdeer and crosses the Little Missouri River switching from Mountain Time to Central Time.

The route continues just west of Mandaree, then meets Highway 73, and finally ends at Highway 23 in an unpopulated area west of Lake Sakakawea and New Town in McKenzie County.

Major intersections

Related route 

ND 22 Bus.'s southern terminus is at ND 22 and ND 200 in Killdeer, and the northern terminus is at ND 22 northwest of Killdeer.

References 

022
Transportation in Adams County, North Dakota
Transportation in Hettinger County, North Dakota
Transportation in Stark County, North Dakota
Transportation in Dunn County, North Dakota
Transportation in McKenzie County, North Dakota